In the mathematical field of complex analysis, Akhiezer's theorem is a result about entire functions proved by Naum Akhiezer.

Statement
Then the following are equivalent:

 There exists an entire function , of exponential type , having all its zeros in the (closed) upper half plane, such that

 

 One has:

Related results
It is not hard to show that the Fejér–Riesz theorem is a special case.

Notes

References

Theorems in complex analysis